The Cub Reporter is a 1922 American silent action film directed by John Francis Dillon and starring Richard Talmadge, Jean Calhoun and Edwin B. Tilton.

Plot

Cast
 Richard Talmadge as Dick Harvey
 Jean Calhoun as Marion Rhodes
 Edwin B. Tilton as Harrison Rhodes
 Clarence Wilson as Mandarin
 Lewis Mason as Crook
 Ethel Hallor as Crook

References

Bibliography
 Munden, Kenneth White. The American Film Institute Catalog of Motion Pictures Produced in the United States, Part 1. University of California Press, 1997.

External links
 

1922 films
1920s action films
American silent feature films
American action films
American black-and-white films
Films directed by John Francis Dillon
1920s English-language films
1920s American films
Silent action films